Tabou is a town in the far southwest of Ivory Coast, near the border of Liberia. It is a sub-prefecture of and the seat of Tabou Department in San-Pédro Region, Bas-Sassandra District. Tabou is also a commune.

In 2021, the population of the sub-prefecture of Tabou was 62,719.

Villages
The 32 villages of the sub-prefecture of Tabou and their population in 2014 are:

Climate
Tabou has a tropical monsoon climate under the Köppen climate classification, with a long wet season.

References

Sub-prefectures of San-Pédro Region
Communes of San-Pédro Region